Cima di Bri is a mountain in the Lepontine Alps, located in the Swiss canton of Ticino. It is situated between Lavertezzo and Biasca, on the range that separates the valleys of Verzasca and Leventina. With an altitude of 2,520 metres, it is the highest summit of this chain south of Passo di Gagnone.

References

External links
Cima di Bri on Hikr

Mountains of the Alps
Mountains of Switzerland
Mountains of Ticino
Lepontine Alps